Of What Was is the first full-length album by in medias res, an indie rock band from Vancouver, British Columbia.  Produced by fellow Vancouver indie act Jonathan Anderson, it was originally self-released on July 8, 2003 and sold out of its initial 1,000 copies within a year and a half.  Of What Was was then picked up by Anniedale Records and re-released on May 24, 2005.  The album was preceded by two EPs, Demos and Intimacy.

Track listing
 "Idée Fixe" - 2:57
 "Radio Friendly" - 2:41a
 "Shakeher" - 3:46
 "A Cause For Concern" - 5:41
 "You Know You Don't Know" - 5:47
 "Best Kept Secret" - 4:20
 "Assembly Lines" - 5:35
 "Annadonia" - 5:24
 "Tail End of a Car Crash" - 0:55
 "Of What Was" — 7:31
 "Silence Calls" - 6:24
 "Silence Calls" - 22:13b

a Originally titled "Wise Investors" in the self-released version.
b Added in the Anniedale Records re-release.

References

External links
Of What Was on Anniedale Records
Of What Was on CD Baby

2005 debut albums